Jonathan Stephen Ross  (born 17 November 1960) is an English broadcaster, film critic, comedian, actor, writer, and producer. He presented the BBC One chat show Friday Night with Jonathan Ross during the 2000s, hosted his own radio show on BBC Radio 2 from 1999 to 2010, and served as film critic and presenter of the Film programme. After leaving the BBC in 2010, Ross began hosting his comedy chat show The Jonathan Ross Show on ITV. Other regular roles have included being a panellist on the comedy sports quiz They Think It's All Over (1999–2005), being a presenter of the British Comedy Awards (1991–2007, 2009–2014), and being a judge on the musical competition show The Masked Singer (2020–present) and its spin-off series The Masked Dancer (2021–present).

Ross began his television career as a TV researcher, before débuting as a presenter for The Last Resort with Jonathan Ross on Channel 4 in 1987. Over the next decade, he presented numerous radio and television programmes, many through his own production company, Channel X. In 1995, he sold his stake in Channel X, and embarked on a career with the BBC in 1997. In 1999, Ross took over presenting the Film programme from Barry Norman, and also began presenting his own radio show, while two years later he began hosting Friday Night with Jonathan Ross. For the chat show, Ross won three BAFTA awards for Best Entertainment Performance, in 2004, 2006 and 2007. By 2006, he was believed to be the BBC's highest-paid star.

In 2005, Ross was made an Officer of the Order of the British Empire (OBE) for services to broadcasting. Ross has been involved in controversies throughout his broadcasting career. As a result, in 2008, he wrote a semi-autobiographical work titled Why Do I Say These Things?, detailing some of his life experiences. He has also written his own comic books, Turf and America's Got Powers.

Early life and education
Jonathan Stephen Ross was born on 17 November 1960 in St Pancras, North London and raised in Leytonstone, East London. The son of John and actress Martha Ross, he has four brothers and one sister. He is the younger brother of journalist, television editor, and media personality Paul Ross.

Their mother put all of her children forward for roles in television advertisements. Ross first appeared in a television advertisement for the breakfast cereal Kellogg's Rice Krispies in 1970, when he was 10 years old. He also appeared in an ad for the laundry detergent Persil.

Ross was educated at the comprehensive schools Norlington School for Boys and Leyton County High School for Boys. He then studied at the Southampton College of Art and took a degree in Modern European History at the School of Slavonic and East European Studies (SSEES) in London, which today forms part of University College London.

Ross began his adult career as a researcher on the Channel 4 show Loose Talk. After leaving this, he worked on various other shows before beginning another research job on Soul Train, which became Solid Soul. It is believed his first appearance on television was as an extra in the 1981 It Ain't Half Hot, Mum episode The Last Roll Call.

Career

1987–95: Channel X
Whilst on Solid Soul, he met fellow researcher Alan Marke, and the two devised what would prove to be a breakthrough hit for Ross in 1987, The Last Resort with Jonathan Ross.

The two men based their concept on the successful American show Late Night with David Letterman, and formed a new production company called Channel X, to produce a pilot. Ross had not planned to be the show's host, but he presented the show from its debut in January 1987.

While the series was initially a co-production with Colin Callender, ownership transferred to Marke and Ross, meaning that the latter retained a great deal of control as well as being presenter. The show was successful for both Ross and for Channel 4, making him one of the major personalities on the channel. A year later, his documentary series The Incredibly Strange Film Show introduced many to the works of cult filmmakers like Sam Raimi and Jackie Chan. Ross and Raimi appeared together in a British television advertisement for Raimi's 1987 film Evil Dead II.

In 1990 and 1991, his television documentary series Jonathan Ross Presents for One Week Only profiled and interviewed directors including Alejandro Jodorowsky, David Lynch, Aki Kaurismäki and in 2014, the Spanish filmmaker Pedro Almodóvar.

In 1989, he co-presented the biennial BBC charity telethon Comic Relief, the same year he launched One Hour with Jonathan Ross a short lived chat show on Channel 4. Its game show segment, "Knock down ginger", introduced comedians such as Vic Reeves, Bob Mortimer, Paul Whitehouse and Charlie Higson to television. In December 1989, Ross appeared on Cilla's Goodbye to the 80s and presented all four members of Queen with the "Top Band of the Eighties" prize in a broadcast for ITV which would turn out to be Freddie Mercury's penultimate public appearance before his death from AIDS in 1991.

Ross presented the annual British Comedy Awards each year from 1991 to 2014 with the exception of 2008 following his suspension from the BBC. In 1992 he presented an interview with Madonna about her Erotica album and Sex Book promotion.

Ross has appeared in numerous television entertainment programmes on several channels throughout the 1990s and 2000s. He was a regular panellist on the sports quiz They Think It's All Over, and hosted the panel game It's Only TV...But I Like It. Other projects include the BBC joke-quiz Gagtag, the Channel 4 variety show Saturday Zoo, new-acts showcase The Big Big Talent Show, and the ITV programme Fantastic Facts.

In 1995, he left Channel X, despite its profitable nature. He was quoted in a 1998 article as stating:

1995–2006
In 1995, he presented Mondo Rosso, a programme about old cult films. He took over presenting of the Film programme, the BBC's long-running cinema review series, in 1999 after Barry Norman left the show. Ross himself has made a number of cameo appearances in films, playing himself in the Spice Girls' film Spice World (1997) and voicing the character of Doris in the UK version of Shrek 2 (2004). In 2001 he also played himself in Only Fools and Horses, presenting Goldrush, a fictional television quiz on which the main character, Del, was a contestant. In 2001 he voiced characters in two episodes of the animated comedy series Rex the Runt. He also appeared on the first pilot show for Shooting Stars, acting as a team captain.

He was the subject of This Is Your Life in March 2001 when he was surprised by Michael Aspel at the BBC Television Centre.

1987, 1999–2010, 2014–2018: BBC Radio
Ross' first radio work was on BBC Radio 1 in 1987, when he sat in for Janice Long for two weeks. Ross began presenting a Saturday morning show on BBC Radio 2 in July 1999. He has also presented radio shows for Virgin Radio (having previously worked on Richard Branson's earlier venture, Radio Radio), as well as the now-defunct commercial radio network service The Superstation, where his producer was Chris Evans. Ross' show on Radio 2 last aired on 17 July 2010 when his contract at the BBC ended.

In August 2014, he returned to Radio 2 as a stand-in presenter on Steve Wright's afternoon show for four days. 
In March 2015 Jonathan sat in for Steve Wright again from 16 to 27 March 2015. In February 2016 Ross returned to Radio 2 on a regular basis to present the weekly arts show. From January 11, 2018, Anneka Rice took over the arts show.

2001–10: Friday Night with Jonathan Ross and other projects

On 2 November 2001, Ross began presenting his BBC One comedy chat show Friday Night with Jonathan Ross.

In 2004, Ross presented a documentary on one of his favourite subjects, punk rock, for the BBC.

In 2005, Ross anchored the BBC television coverage of the Live 8 concerts. Later that year he was made an Officer of the Order of the British Empire in the Queen's Birthday Honours for services to broadcasting. He celebrated the news by playing "God Save the Queen" by The Sex Pistols (which was banned by the BBC when released in 1977) on his BBC Radio 2 Saturday morning show. On 21 June 2006, Ross was made a Fellow of University College London, where he studied.

In early 2006, Ross announced that after eight years he was quitting his regular panellist seat on the sport/comedy quiz show They Think It's All Over explaining: "I need time now to focus on my other commitments and so regrettably I won't be back for the 20th series." After Ross's departure, only two more episodes of the show were made before it was cancelled.

In January 2006 he presented Jonathan Ross' Asian Invasion, broadcast on BBC Four. The three-part documentary followed Ross as he explored the film industry in Japan, Hong Kong and South Korea, interviewing directors and showcasing clips. His interest in East Asian culture and his self-confessed love for Japanese anime and video games led him to making three series of BBC Three show Japanorama, as well as producing another television series for the same channel called Adam and Joe Go Tokyo, starring Adam Buxton and Joe Cornish. He produced the latter programme through his own television production company Hot Sauce.

In June 2006, a bidding war was sparked between BBC and other broadcasters for Ross's services. Although other broadcasters were unsuccessful in poaching Ross, it is believed that their bids were higher than the BBC during negotiations. ITV, who bid for Ross, poached chat host Michael Parkinson around the same time. Ross became the highest paid television personality in Britain, when a new BBC contract secured his services until 2010, for a reported £18 million (£6 million per year). That same month, he was named by Radio Times as the most powerful person in British radio.

On 25 June 2006, he performed at the Children's Party at the Palace for the Queen's 80th birthday. In August 2006, Ross asked the first question in the Yahoo! Answers "Five Million Answers challenge".

On 16 March 2007, Ross hosted Comic Relief 2007 alongside Fearne Cotton and Lenny Henry.

On 7 July 2007, Ross co-presented (with Graham Norton) BBC television coverage of the Live Earth climate change awareness concerts, which became the subject of controversy due to the foul language used by performers including Phil Collins, Madonna and Johnny Borrell, resulting in one of Ofcom's toughest sanctions to date on the BBC. Ross had been required to apologise on the day for the language used by Collins and Borrell.

Starting on 10 September 2007, he presented the BBC Four series Comics Britannia, about the history of the British comic. This forms the core of a Comics Britannia season, which includes another documentary, In Search of Steve Ditko, by Ross. Ross is also greatly interested in Japan, presenting a BBC-TV series on many different aspects of Japanese culture, Japanorama, for three series between 2002 and 2007.

In May 2008, Ross won the Sony Gold Award "Music Radio Personality of the Year".

On 3 August 2008, he hosted Jonathan Ross Salutes Dad's Army, a BBC One tribute to the sitcom set during World War II.

In 2010, Ross took part in Channel 4's Comedy Gala, a benefit show held in aid of Great Ormond Street Children's Hospital, filmed live at the O2 Arena in London on 30 March.

On 7 April 2010, Ross's first comic book was published. Turf was written by Jonathan himself and drawn by artist Tommy Lee Edwards. In 2011, Ross wrote an introduction for The Steve Ditko Omnibus Vol. 1, a collection of work by the American comics artist featured in Ross's 2007 documentary.

2010: Leaving the BBC
On 7 January 2010, Ross confirmed that he would leave the BBC in July 2010. This would see him leave all his regular BBC roles, namely his Friday night chat show, Radio 2 show and the film review programme, although he would be continuing with some specials, such as Comic Relief and the BAFTA Awards.

Ross said that while he "had a wonderful time working for the BBC" he had "decided not to re-negotiate when my current contract comes to an end," a choice which was  "not financially motivated". The announcement came a day after it became public knowledge that Graham Norton had signed a two-year deal with the BBC. Torin Douglas, the corporation's media correspondent speculated Norton would be a ready-made replacement for Ross's chat show role, while Mark Kermode of BBC Radio 5 Live was a potential successor in the film review role, but that "replacing Ross on radio will be harder." Ross last appeared on the film programme in Episode 10 of Film 2010 with Jonathan Ross aired on 17 March 2010. After Kermode publicly ruled himself out on 26 March, Claudia Winkleman was announced 30 March 2010 as his replacement as host of the Film programme.

Ross's final Friday Night chat show episode aired on 16 July 2010, with David Beckham, Jackie Chan, Mickey Rourke, and Roxy Music as guests. Ross ended the show with an affectionate tribute to his guests and to the audience, while mentioning that he had promised Morrissey that he would remain composed and "wouldn't cry." His final Radio 2 show was broadcast the following day. Patrick Kielty initially took over Ross' Radio 2 slot, after which Graham Norton took over permanently from 2 October that year.

2010–present: ITV and Channel 4
On 19 December 2010, Ross presented a three-hour Channel 4 list show, 100 Greatest Toys, with the broadcaster describing Ross as a "huge toy enthusiast with a private collection that would rival any museum's."

In 2012, Ross's voice appeared as a Headteacher in "Back to School" at the Edinburgh Festival

In October 2013, Ross was hired by Xbox (Microsoft) to help promote the brand. In 2011, he presented Penn & Teller: Fool Us on ITV, a collaboration with magicians Penn & Teller, which he would resume hosting when the show moved to The CW in 2014.

Ross's new chat show The Jonathan Ross Show began on 3 September 2011 on ITV1, drawing an audience of 4.3m viewers, compared to the 4.6m for his finale on the BBC show. The first series ran for thirteen weeks. Speaking about the new show, Ross said: "I am thrilled and excited that after a short break I will be rolling up my sleeves and creating a brand new show for ITV1."

On 20 October 2014, it was announced by ITV that Ross had signed a new contract with ITV. The new contract will see him present two more series of his chatshow along with a Christmas Special on ITV in 2015. ITV's Director of Entertainment and Comedy Elaine Bedell added: "Jonathan is the king of talk shows and a valued member of the ITV family. He continues to attract the biggest names in showbiz onto his sofa and I am delighted that he will remain on the channel until at least the end of 2015. "Ross said: "I've been lucky enough to interview some of the biggest stars around on The Jonathan Ross Show and I'm delighted that I'll continue to do so for ITV until at least the end of 2015 with two series booked for the channel for next year."

In 2015, Ross's 2004 interview with Amy Winehouse was featured in Asif Kapadia's highly praised documentary film about the late singer, entitled as Amy.

In 2017, Ross was a team captain along with Frank Skinner on the ITV panel show, Don't Ask Me Ask Britain. In December 2017, Ross presented Guess the Star, a one-off special for ITV. On 9 September 2019, Ross was announced as a judge for The Masked Singer UK, the UK version of the international music game show Masked Singer, which aired on ITV from January 2020.

In August 2020, Ross appeared on Gordon Ramsay's The F Word where Ramsay shows Ross how to kill lobster. In September 2020, Ross started hosting his own 30 minute weekly show called Jonathan Ross' Comedy Club.

On 4 March 2021, it was announced by ITV that Ross would be on the 'star panel' of a brand new spin off show of The Masked Singer UK, The Masked Dancer, which aired in spring 2021.

Ross made his debut appearance on Celebrity Gogglebox on 2 July 2021, and was joined by his son Harvey, daughter Honey and her boyfriend.

Personal life

Ross married author/journalist/broadcaster Jane Goldman in 1988. They have since had three children: Betty Kitten, Harvey Kirby (named after Jack Kirby, a comic book creator whom Ross especially admires), and Honey Kinny. In 2005, Ross was made an OBE in the Queen's Birthday Honours for services to broadcasting. He celebrated the news by playing "God Save the Queen" by the Sex Pistols on his Radio 2 show.

Ross resides in Hampstead, London. He owns a second home in Swanage in Dorset and owns property in Florida in the United States.

Ross and others have used his rhotacism for comic effect, and he is sometimes known as "Wossy", including on his Twitter feed (@wossy).

Ross is a big pop and rock music fan and maintains a particular interest in British punk rock, which captivated him when he was young. The first band he saw in concert was punk band X-Ray Spex at Islington's Hope and Anchor pub in North London. He paid tribute to lead singer Poly Styrene following her death. He has described himself as "about as big a fan of David Bowie as you will find on the planet". The glam art rock band Roxy Music are one of his all-time favourite acts and were invited to perform on the final episode of Friday Night with Jonathan Ross.

Ross is a fan of science fiction, including Doctor Who. He contributed his early memories of the series, which included the 1968 serial The Invasion, to a book which raised funds for Alzheimer's Research UK.

Ross is also a fan of comic books and co-owned a comic shop in London with Paul Gambaccini. He released Turf, his first comic book, in 2010, with American artist Tommy Lee Edwards.

Ross has attended a fundraiser for the James Randi Educational Foundation called The Amazing Meeting in London in 2009 and 2010. Ross has described himself as a big fan of James Randi and the other speakers – who were mainly prominent sceptics – and said that he and his wife had come to have a sceptical view of the world. Ross has been supportive of Simon Singh's efforts to defend an accusation of libel by the British Chiropractic Association and Ross has posed for the Geek Calendar 2011, a fund raiser for The Libel Reform Campaign.

Ross’ mother, Martha Ross, died on 14 January 2019, at the age of 79.

Controversies

BBC contract
In April 2006, details of his fees and those of other BBC personalities were leaked to the tabloid press. It was claimed at the time, by a then-unidentified BBC mole, that Ross earned £530,000 per year for hosting his Radio 2 show (equivalent to £10,000 per show). While refusing to comment specifically on the leak in line with BBC policy on the matter, Ross did hint during his radio show that the figure was exaggerated; in addition to this, any pay highlighted as being "his" would actually be split between himself and his producer/co-presenter on the show, Andy Davies.

David Cameron interview
In June 2006, when Conservative Party leader David Cameron appeared on Friday Night with Jonathan Ross, Ross began a line of questioning relating to Conservative ex-Prime Minister Margaret Thatcher, culminating in the question "Did you or did you not have a wank thinking of Margaret Thatcher?" Ross was defended by the BBC publicly, but repeat showings of the interview have been banned.

"1,000 journalists" comment
On 5 December 2007, Ross joked at the British Comedy Awards that his salary meant that he was "apparently worth 1,000 BBC journalists". His quip came shortly after the BBC had announced plans for more than 2,000 job cuts, and was condemned as "obscene" by the general secretary of the National Union of Journalists. Ross has denied this and in a 2011 article is quoted as saying that he was commenting on a piece that was written in a newspaper about his salary being that of 1,000 journalists:

You know where that came from? The newspapers. After the fee was announced, they said, 'The BBC says he's worth 1,000 journalists', so on the Comedy Awards I made a joke that began, 'Apparently I'm worth 1,000 journalists according to the newspapers.' Every time it's quoted, is the word 'apparently' ever used? Which does change the meaning somewhat.

Gwyneth Paltrow interview
The BBC Trust ruled that Ross's interview with American actress Gwyneth Paltrow, broadcast on 2 May 2008, breached editorial guidelines. They ruled that bad language in an episode of Ross's pre-recorded BBC1 chat show, Friday Night with Jonathan Ross, in which the presenter told Paltrow he "would fuck her", was "gratuitous and unnecessarily offensive". The trust said it disagreed with the judgement made by BBC management that the episode should be broadcast uncensored, adding that the comment was made in an "overly sexual way" and that it had upheld a number of complaints made about the edition of Friday Night with Jonathan Ross. The trust reminded BBC staff that "the casual gratuitous use of the most offensive language is not acceptable on the BBC in accordance with the BBC's existing guidelines and practices", adding that "this particularly applies in entertainment programmes".

The Russell Brand Show and Andrew Sachs

Following a guest appearance by Ross on The Russell Brand Show broadcast on 18 October 2008, Ross was suspended for 12 weeks without pay by the BBC on 29 October, after a series of lewd answerphone messages, including Ross saying, "He fucked your granddaughter", were left for then 78-year-old actor Andrew Sachs regarding Sachs' granddaughter Georgina Baillie, by Russell Brand and Ross, which were broadcast on the pre-recorded show. After little initial interest, a media story about the calls by the Daily Mail generated a high number of complaints. Brand resigned from the BBC, while Ross was suspended without pay. BBC director general Mark Thompson stated that Ross should take the disciplinary action as a "final warning". The BBC was later fined £150,000 by Britain's broadcast regulator for airing the calls.

On 21 November 2008, the BBC Trust said that the phone calls were a "deplorable intrusion with no editorial justification". The trust gave its backing to Ross's 12-week suspension but recommended that no further action be taken against him. He returned to work in January 2009 with a new series of Friday Night. From 23 May 2009, Ross' BBC Radio 2 show was recorded 24 hours before broadcast.

Homophobia accusation
On 13 May 2009, Ross was accused of homophobia after a comment he made on his radio show, in which he said,

If your son asks for a Hannah Montana MP3 player, then you might want to already think about putting him down for adoption in later life, when they settle down with their partner.

An incorrect version of this quote was also circulated, in which Ross was accused of saying:

If your son asks for a Hannah Montana MP3 player, you might want to already think about putting him down for adoption before he brings his ... erm ... partner home.

Ofcom received 61 complaints following the comment. On 7 July 2009, Ofcom ruled that Ross did not breach the broadcasting code. They wrote in their opinion that "the comment was clearly presented as a joke intended to make light of the reactions that some parents may have if their child chooses a toy that is very widely recognised to be designed and marketed for the opposite sex" and that the nature of the joke and tone and manner in which it was presented "made clear that it was not intended to be hostile or pejorative towards the gay community in general." Stonewall criticised the ruling; saying "the fact that a comment is light-hearted does not absolve it from perpetuating the stereotypes that lead to homophobic bullying."

Hugo Awards 
On 1 March 2014 Loncon 3, the 72nd World Science Fiction Convention, announced that Ross would be the Master of Ceremonies for the 2014 Hugo Awards ceremony, to be held in August at ExCeL London. This generated angry criticism from members of science fiction fandom who objected to the idea, citing Ross's record of controversial statements and actions. Convention committee member Farah Mendlesohn strongly objected to the choice of Ross as MC, and resigned when the Loncon 3 Co-Chairs would not reconsider the choice, writing (in part), '[Ross] is a man who has made a fortune (6 million a year at one point) from abusing others—particularly women—live on air.' He publicly withdrew as MC not long after the announcement, tweeting 'I have decided to withdraw from hosting the Hugo's @loncon3 in response to some who would rather I weren't there. Have a lovely convention.'

Filmography

Television

As himself

As actor

Film

Television advertisements

Video games

Animation

Honours and awards
2005, Ross was made an OBE by Prince Charles in the Queen's Birthday Honours for services to broadcasting.
2006, made a Fellow of University College, London (UCL), into which his alma mater, SSEES, had been absorbed.
2012, Special Recognition award at the National Television Awards.

References

Further reading
Jonathan Ross: The Biography, Neil Simpson, John Blake Publishing Ltd (31 July 2007), 
Why Do I Say These Things?, Jonathan Ross, Bantam Press (16 October 2008),

External links

The Jonathan Ross Show on itv.com
Jonathan Ross' Must-Watch Films on itv.com
Saturday Night At The Movies on Classic FM

Interactive video talk by Jonathan Ross on Ealing studios for the British Film Institute

1960 births
21st-century British screenwriters
20th-century English male actors
21st-century English male actors
21st-century English writers
Alumni of Solent University
Alumni of University College London
Alumni of the UCL School of Slavonic and East European Studies
Best Entertainment Performance BAFTA Award (television) winners
BBC Radio 2 presenters
BBC television presenters
British male television writers
Businesspeople from London
English film critics
English game show hosts
English male comedians
English male film actors
English male non-fiction writers
English male television actors
English male voice actors
English radio DJs
English television presenters
English television producers
English television talk show hosts
English television writers
Friday Night with Jonathan Ross
Living people
Officers of the Order of the British Empire
People from Leytonstone
People from St Pancras, London
People with speech impediment
Jonathan
Television personalities from London